The Taniquetil Montes are a range of mountains on Titan, the largest moon of the planet Saturn. The range is located near Titan's equator, between 2-4° south and 211-214° west. It is located within the Adiri region, just west of the landing site of the Huygens probe.

The Taniquetil Montes are named after Taniquetil, a mountain in the Undying Lands in J. R. R. Tolkien's fictional universe. The name follows a convention that Titanean mountains are named after mountains in Tolkien's work. It was formally announced on November 13, 2012.

References

Mountain ranges
Surface features of Titan (moon)
Extraterrestrial surface features named for Middle-earth